Damian Janikowski (born June 27, 1989 in Wrocław) is a Polish mixed martial artist and former wrestler who won the Bronze medal at the 2012 London Olympics in the Greco-Roman 84 kg category. He is currently ranked #8 in the KSW Middleweight rankings.

Wrestling career
At the 2011 World Championships, he won the silver medal in the 84 kg men's Greco-Roman division.  He beat Pedro Garcia Perez, Alan Khugaev, Eerik Aps and Nazmi Avluca before losing to Alim Selimov in the final.

At the 2012 European Championships, he beat Zhan Belenyuk, Jim Petterson and Andrea Minguzzi, before losing to Hristo Marinov.

Janikowski represented his native Poland at the 2012 Summer Olympics in London where he won the bronze medal. He beat Nazmi Avluca in the first round, Amer Hrustanović in the next and Pablo Shorey in the quarter final before losing to Karam Gaber in the semifinal. Janikowski was entered in to the repechage, where he beat Mélonin Noumonvi to win his bronze medal.

At the 2014 European Championships, he beat Javid Hamzatov before losing to Rami Hietaniemi.  Because Hietaniemi reached the semifinals, Janikowski was entered into the repechage.  In the repechage, he beat Ahmet Yildirim, Jim Petterson and Robert Kobliashvili, before beating Jan Fischer to win his bronze medal.

Mixed martial arts career
In 2017, Janikowski opted to try his hand at mixed martial arts and signed with the Konfrontacja Sztuk Walki organization. He made his debut at KSW 39 on May 27, 2017. He faced Julio Gallegos and won the fight via TKO due to knees and punches in the first round.

Janikowski faced Szymon Kołecki at KSW 52 on December 7, 2019. He lost the fight via a second round knockout.

Damian faced Andreas Gustafsson at KSW 55: Askham vs. Khalidov 2. He won the fight via split decision.

Janikowski faced Jason Radcliffe at KSW 59 on March 20, 2021. He won the bout via TKO in the second round.

Janikowski faced ex-UFC fighter Paweł Pawlak in his KSW debut on September 4, 2021 at KSW 63: Soldić vs. Kincl. He lost the bout via unanimous decision.

Janikowski faced Tomasz Jakubiec on March 19, 2022 at KSW 68: Parnasse vs. Rutkowski. He won the bout in the first round, knocking Jakubiec unconscious.

Janikowski faced Tom Breese on September 10, 2022 at KSW 74, controversially losing via guillotine choke in the second round, with the bout being stopped after the ref thought that Janikowski tapped when he said he didn't.

Mixed martial arts record

|-
|Win
|align=center|8–5
|Mateusz Kubiszyn	
|Decision (unanimous)
|HIGH League 5
|
|align=center|3
|align=center|3:00
|Łódź, Poland
|
|-
|Loss
|align=center|7–5
|Tom Breese
|Submission (guillotine choke)
|KSW 74: De Fries vs. Prasel
|
|align=center|2
|align=center|1:53
|Ostrów Wielkopolski, Poland
| 
|-
|Win
|align=center|7–4
|Tomasz Jakubiec
|KO (punch)
|KSW 68: Parnasse vs. Rutkowski
|
|align=center|1
|align=center|3:42
|Radom, Poland
| 
|-
|Loss
|align=center|6–4
| Paweł Pawlak
| Decision (unanimous)
| KSW 63: Crime of The Century
|
|align=center|3
|align=center|5:00
|Warszawa, Poland
| 
|-
|Win
|align=center|6–3
|Jason Radcliffe
|TKO (punches)
|KSW 59: Fight Code
|
|align=center| 2
|align=center| 4:41
|Łódź, Poland
|
|-
|Win
|align=center|5–3
| Andreas Gustafsson
| Decision (split)
| KSW 55: Askham vs. Khalidov 2
|
|align=center|3
|align=center|5:00
|Łódź, Poland
| 
|-
|Loss
|align=center|4–3
| Szymon Kołecki
| TKO (punches)
| KSW 52: Race
|
|align=center|2
|align=center|3:03
|Gliwice, Poland
| 
|-
|-
| Win
| align=center| 4–2
|Tony Giles
| Submission (verbal)
|KSW 50: London
|  
| align=center| 1
| align=center| 1:24
| London, England
|
|-
|-
| Loss
| align=center| 3–2
| Aleksandar Ilić
| KO (head kick)
|KSW 47: The X-Warriors
|  
| align=center| 3
| align=center| 0:23
| Łódź, Poland
|
|-
|-
|Loss
| align=center|3–1
| Michał Materla	
| TKO (punches)
|KSW 45: The Return to Wembley
|
| align=center|1 
| align=center|3:10
|London, England
|
|-
|-
|-
| Win
| align=center|3–0 
| Yannick Bahati	
| TKO (punches)
| KSW 43: Soldić vs. Du Plessis
| 
| align=center|1 
| align=center|0:18
| Wrocław, Poland
|
|-
|-
| Win
| align=center|2–0 
| Antoni Chmielewski	
| TKO (punches)
| KSW 41: Mankowski vs. Soldić
| 
| align=center|2 
| align=center|2:33
| Katowice, Poland
|
|-
| Win
| align=center|1–0 
| Julio Gallegos	
| TKO (knee and punches)
| KSW 39: Colosseum
| 
| align=center|1 
| align=center|1:26
| Warszawa, Poland
|

See also
 List of current KSW fighters
 List of male mixed martial artists

References 

 

Living people
1989 births
Polish male sport wrestlers
Polish male mixed martial artists
Mixed martial artists utilizing Greco-Roman wrestling
Sportspeople from Wrocław
Wrestlers at the 2012 Summer Olympics
Olympic bronze medalists for Poland
Olympic wrestlers of Poland
Olympic medalists in wrestling
Medalists at the 2012 Summer Olympics
European Games competitors for Poland
Wrestlers at the 2015 European Games
World Wrestling Championships medalists
European Wrestling Championships medalists
20th-century Polish people
21st-century Polish people